Tyrfing, Tirfing or Tyrving (the name is of uncertain origin, possibly connected to the Terwingi) was a magic sword in Norse mythology, which features  in the Tyrfing Cycle, which includes a poem from the Poetic Edda called Hervararkviða, and the Hervarar saga. The name is also used in the saga to denote the Goths. The form Tervingi was actually recorded by Roman sources in the 4th century.

Svafrlami was the king of Gardariki, and Odin's grandson. He managed to trap the dwarfs Dvalinn and Durinn when they had left the rock where they dwelt. Then he forced them to forge a sword with a golden hilt that would never miss a stroke, would never rust and would cut through stone and iron as easily as through clothes.

The dwarfs made the sword, and it shone and gleamed like fire. However, in revenge they cursed it so that it would kill a man every time it was drawn and that it would be the cause of three great evils. They finally cursed it so that it would also kill Svafrlami himself.

When Svafrlami heard the curses he tried to slay Dvalinn, but the dwarf disappeared into the rock and the sword was driven deep into it, though missing its intended victim.

Svafrlami was killed by the berserker Arngrim, who took the sword in his turn. After Arngrim, it was worn by Angantyr and his eleven brothers. They were all slain at Samsø, by the Swedish champion Hjalmar, and his Norwegian sworn brother Orvar-Odd; but Hjalmar, being wounded by Tyrfing (its first evil deed), has only time to sing his death-song before he dies, and asks Orvar-Odd to bring his body to his beloved Ingeborg, daughter of Yngvi, at Uppsala.

Angantyr's daughter, Hervor (by his wife Tófa) was brought up as a bond-servant and remained ignorant of her parentage. Upon learning it, she armed herself as a shieldmaiden, and travelled to Munarvoe in Samsø in an attempt to recover her father's weapon. She found it and married King Gudmund's son, Höfund. Together they had two sons, Heidrek and Angantyr (the second). Hervor gave Heidrek the sword Tyrfing in secret. While Angantyr and Heidrek walked, Heidrek showed Angantyr the sword. Since he had unsheathed it, the curse the dwarfs had put on the sword made Heidrek kill his brother Angantyr. This was the second of Tyrfing's three evil deeds.

Heidrek became king of the Goths. During a voyage, Heidrek camped at the Carpathians (Harvaða fjöllum, cf. Grimm's law). He was accompanied by eight mounted thralls, who eventually entered his tent and slew him in his sleep, the third and final of Tyrfing's evil deeds. Heidrek's son, also named Angantyr (the third), caught and killed the thralls and reclaimed the magic sword, finally satisfying the dwarfs' curse.

Angantyr was the next king of the Goths, but his illegitimate half-Hun brother Hlod (or Hlöd, Hlöðr) wanted half of the kingdom. Angantýr refused, and Gizur called Hlod a bastard and his mother a slave-girl. Hlod and 343,200 mounted Huns invaded the Goths (See The Battle of the Goths and Huns). The Huns greatly outnumbered the Goths.  The Goths won because Angantyr used Tyrfing to kill his brother Hlod on the battleground. The bodies of the numerous warriors choked the rivers, causing a flood which filled the valleys with dead men and horses.

The curse on Tyrfing is comparable to that placed on the ring Andvaranaut in the Völsung Cycle.

For links to source text in English translation and Old Norse and for general commentary see Hervarar saga ok Heiðreks.

Influence on modern Fantasy

The theme of a cursed sword which causes evil deeds whenever drawn was taken up by several modern writers of Fantasy - notably Michael Moorcock's Stormbringer, the magic sword wielded by the doomed albino emperor Elric of Melniboné. Science fiction author Poul Anderson included Tyrfing in his medieval fantasy novel The Broken Sword. In a more lighthearted tone, the theme was also taken up by Lawrence Watt-Evans in The Misenchanted Sword. The sword also appears in the novel: The Quickleys and the Keeper of Balance by M J Packham.

In popular culture
Tyrfing has been referenced in a variety of modern contexts that reference Norse mythology. Tyrfing has been used as the name of a hot sauce on Hot Ones, the name of a "demon sword" in High School DxD, a holy weapon in Fire Emblem: Genealogy of the Holy War, and a cursed sword in Castlevania: Symphony of the Night.

See also
Fornsigtuna

References

Mythological Norse weapons
Mythological swords
Tyrfing cycle